The 1986–87 Essex Senior Football League season was the 16th in the history of Essex Senior Football League, a football competition in England.

League table

The league featured 15 clubs which competed in the league last season, along with two new clubs:
Purfleet, joined from the Reserve division
Woodford Town reserves

League table

References

Essex Senior Football League seasons
1986–87 in English football leagues